Tom Hoover was the leading engineer of the Chrysler 426 Hemi engine.

Tom Hoover's development of the first trademarked Hemi engine through Chrysler Corporation was a major success for the brand through the mid to late 1960s and early 1970s. The original 426 cubic inch Hemi converted to a massive 7.0 liter displacement in current terminology, earning the nickname "elephant" because of its unusually large engine block, heavy weight, and big increases in power from the previous generation of Chrysler engines. The new trademarked engine was utilized in some of Chrysler Corporation's  brands like Dodge and Plymouth. This helped the corporation cut costs in development, as separate manufacturers like Dodge had to develop their own engines.

Tom Hoover's development of the engine was simple. The cylinder head design of the past engines was a wedge, restricting air flow at higher engine revolution speed. The hemispherical cylinder head design increased power by utilizing the valves. In a hemispherical cylinder head, when air enters the combustion chamber through the intake valve, it flows to the exhaust valve instead of being forced through the exhaust valve as pressure is built up in the combustion chamber.

While Tom Hoover developed the 426 Hemi engine, cylinder heads can be interchanged between specific engines. The development team at Chrysler tried using wedge cylinder heads at first. Horsepower was recorded at 490 base horsepower. When swapped with the hemispherical heads, the engine immediately produced 550 horsepower.

Hoover's design won the 1964 Daytona 500. The engine was then banned by NASCAR. Most NHRA vehicles are still powered by the basic blueprint of the 426 Hemi.

Tom Hoover died on April 30, 2015 at the age of 85.

References 

Chrysler people
2015 deaths
American engineers